"Took the Last Train" is a song by David Gates, lead singer of the group Bread, which was released as a single in 1978 following the premiere of the hit film The Goodbye Girl. It was the follow-up single to the title track hit song from the album of the same name.

The song contains French lyrics, which are then followed by the translation in English.  The 'last train' goes to St-Tropez, a town on the French Riviera.

"Took the Last Train" reached number 30 in the U.S., on both the Billboard Hot 100 and Cash Box Top 100. It peaked at number 7 for three weeks on the Adult Contemporary chart.  The song was similarly successful in Canada.

Personnel
David Gates - vocals, bass
Dean Parks - guitar
Larry Knechtel - piano, synthesizer
Jim Horn - alto saxophone
Mike Botts - drums

Chart performance

Weekly singles charts

Year-end charts

References

External links 
 

1978 songs
1978 singles
David Gates songs
Songs written by David Gates
Songs written by Larry Knechtel
Elektra Records singles
Macaronic songs
Songs about trains
Songs about cities
Songs about France
Saint-Tropez in fiction